Franck Lobono (born 10 March 1968, Monaco) is a Monegasque politician. Since 2018, he is a member of the National Council of Monaco and a President of the Housing Commission.

Life 
Franck Lobono was born on 10 March 1968 in Monaco. From 1978 to 1986, he attended Arbert 1st School in Monaco. Previously Lobono was a Vice-President of the Association of Young Monegasques. Before being elected to the National Council in 2018, Lobono was a President of the Jardins d’Apolline Resident's Association. He is a company manager, deputy chairman of Media and Events, and a President of the “Pontons de Monaco” association.

Political career 
In 2018, Lobono was elected to the National Council of Monaco from the political group Priority Monaco (Primo!). The same year he was appointed as a President of the Housing Commission. As a President of the Housing Commission, Lobono declares that by the end of 2022 the problem of housing shortage will be solved in Monaco.

References

1968 births
Members of the National Council (Monaco)
Living people
Priorité Monaco politicians